The Princess of Dhagabad is a 2000 novel, the first book of a trilogy by Anna Kashina.

Plot introduction
The Princess of Dhagabad follows the princess as she grows up, in fictional Dhagabad, into a young woman of seventeen, when she proves that she more than capable of taking her destiny—and the destiny of Dhagabad—into her hands.

Plot summary

A magical book written with the exotic flavor of Arabian Nights, The Princess of Dhagabad is the first in a trilogy of fantasy novels. This sensuous and vividly imagined novel is about the coming-of-age of an Arabian princess, who is destined to be heiress to the throne of Dhagabad, and her relationship with Hasan, an all-powerful djinn who becomes her slave, teacher and steadfast companion. 
The Princess of Dhagabad follows the princess as she grows from a child of twelve into a young woman of seventeen, at which age she proves, against all tradition, that she is more than capable of taking her destiny-and the destiny of Dhagabad-in hand.

Hasan, her devoted djinn, whose power and omniscience crush him under an unbearable burden, gradually releases himself from his centuries-old pain and apathy. He grows to enjoy spending time with his mistress, until one day-against all odds-he discovers a power greater than wisdom or immortality, greater than suffering—love.

Characters in "The Princess of Dhagabad"

Princess - The Princess of Dhagabad, protagonist
Hasan the Djinn - The princess' slave djinn
The Sultan- The princess' father, Sultan of Dhagabad
The Sultana- The princess' mother, Sultana of Dhagabad

Major themes
Djinn
Arabian Nights
Princesses
Marriage
Fictional places

Release details
2000, USA, Herodias , Pub date 15 May 2000, Hardcover

Sources, references, external links, quotations
Anna Kashina's official book website

American fantasy novels
2000 American novels